Igor Obert (born 14 July 1982 in Partizánske) is a Slovak football defender who currently plays for KFC Komárno. His former club were MŠK - Thermál Veľký Meder, ŠK Svätý Jur, MFK Zemplín Michalovce, FC Vysočina Jihlava and FK DAC 1904 Dunajská Streda and Olympiakos Volou.

References

External links

DAC Dunajská Streda

MFK Dubnica profile

1982 births
Living people
Slovak footballers
Association football defenders
FK Dubnica players
FC DAC 1904 Dunajská Streda players
Olympiacos Volos F.C. players
Slovak Super Liga players
Super League Greece players
Czech First League players
FC Vysočina Jihlava players
MFK Zemplín Michalovce players
Expatriate footballers in the Czech Republic
People from Partizánske
Sportspeople from the Trenčín Region